() is a type of po or dried meat, made from beef. It is a traditional Korean food, commonly eaten as snack food, banchan (food accompanying bap) or anju (food accompanying sul). It is also one of the foods prepared for traditional occasions such as pyebaek (formal greetings from the newlyweds after the wedding ceremony) and jesa (ancestral rite).

Name 

History

Varieties 
Dried thinly sliced beef is usually called , while when the meat is pounded flat and dried it is called .

 – thick slices of lean meat is repeatedly grilled to sear skin, beaten with bats, and seasoned with aged soy sauce, until thoroughly cooked
 – thinly sliced beef, parboiled in water and jeotguk (liquid from salted seafood) and dried
 – thinly sliced beef, seasoned, beaten, cut into circles, stuffed with a few pine nuts and sealed into half-moon shape, dried and grilled
  – beef is pounded flat with knife, and dried
 – pounded beef is shaped into a size and shape of a jujube
 – beef pounded and marinated with soy sauce
 – thinly sliced beef, marinated with oil, soy sauce, and salt, and eaten raw or grilled without being dried
 – sliced pieces of beef is massaged with salt and sun-dried
 – meat is thinly sliced, seasoned with soy sauce, oil, sugar, and pepper, massaged, and dried on sokuri

Use 
Yukpo is eaten as snack food, banchan (food accompanying bap) or anju (food accompanying sul). Yukpo is also one of the foods prepared for traditional occasions such as pyebaek (formal greetings from the newlyweds after the wedding ceremony) and jesa (ancestral rite).

See also 

 Beef jerky
 Dried meat
 List of beef dishes

References

External links
 

Dried meat
Korean beef dishes